Martin John Binks (born 15 September 1953) is an English former footballer who played as a defender in the Football League for Colchester United and Cambridge United.

Career

Born in Romford, Binks began his career with Leyton Orient, but failed to make a first team appearance for the club. He moved to Colchester United in 1972, where he made ten league appearances.

He made his league debut on 19 August 1972 in a 2–1 defeat to Hartlepool United. Coincidentally, his final appearance for the club came in the reverse fixture, a 1–1 draw at Layer Road with Hartlepool.

Following his exit from Colchester, Binks joined up with Cambridge United in 1973, making one appearance before moving to Dartford.

References

External links

1953 births
Living people
Footballers from Romford
English footballers
Association football defenders
Leyton Orient F.C. players
Colchester United F.C. players
Cambridge United F.C. players
Dartford F.C. players
English Football League players